Sandra Lang (born ) is a former Chinese Cantopop singer who was active in the 1970s and actress in Hong Kong. Lang is credited with over 25 films.

Early life 
In 1953, Lang was born in the United States.

Career 
During the late 1960s, Lang's career began as a singer in the HK English pop group named The Chopsticks. The group did not last long, as Lang soon went solo for TVB.

In 1970, Lang became an actress in Taiwanese film. Lang appeared as Linda in The Wandering Generation, a 1970 Taiwan film directed by Yang Tun-Ping. In 1974, Lang became an actress in Hong Kong film. Lang was known as Sin Do-Laai. Lang first appeared in Hong Kong film in Fun, Hong Kong Style, a 1974 Comedy film directed by Ng Wui. Lang's last film was Family Affairs, a 1994 Comedy Drama film directed by Cheung Ji-Kok. Lang is credited with over 25 films.

In 1974 her Cantonese TV theme song "The Yuanfen of a Wedding that Cries and Laughs" (啼笑姻緣) would make Cantopop the new music phenomenon.  The song was aired on TVB Jade on 11 March 1974 at 7 pm. The 1974 version of the song was written by Joseph Koo.

Filmography

Films 
This is a partial list of films.
 1970 The Wandering Generation - Linda
 1974 Fun, Hong Kong Style 
 1994 Family Affairs

Personal life 
In 1999, Lang became a naturalized Canadian citizen.

References

External links 
 Sandra Lang at imdb
 Sandra Lang at filmaffinity.com

Cantopop singers
20th-century Hong Kong women singers
Hong Kong film actresses
Living people
1953 births